Martensopoda is a genus of Indian huntsman spiders that was first described by Peter Jäger in 2006.  it contains three species, found in India: M. minuscula, M. sanctor, and M. transversa.

See also
 List of Sparassidae species

References

Araneomorphae genera
Sparassidae
Spiders of the Indian subcontinent